Joonas Riekkinen (born August 11, 1987) is a Finnish professional ice hockey player who currently plays for the Herlev Eagles of the Metal Ligaen in Denmark.

Riekkinen signed a two-year contract with Ilves on April 24, 2014. He had previously spent the entirety of his playing career as a youth and professional within KalPa of the Liiga.

References

External links

1987 births
Living people
Finnish ice hockey centres
Gentofte Stars players
Herlev Eagles players
Herning Blue Fox players
Hvidovre Ligahockey players
Ilves players
KalPa players